Churchill High School is a secondary school in Winnipeg, Manitoba that teaches grades 7 to 12. It is part of the Winnipeg School Division.

History
Located within the boundaries of the Winnipeg School Division, Churchill High School is named after Sir Winston Churchill (1874 – 1965).  Sir Winston Churchill was a British statesman, historian and orator who served as the British Prime Minister until 1955.  He devoted his powers to seeking world peace.  Sir Winston Churchill was described as having the heart of a lion, the courage of a bulldog and a digestive system similar to a cement mixer.  He first visited Winnipeg in 1901 stating that "Winnipeg is a Winner".  The cornerstone of Churchill High School was laid in 1955, where Arnold Avenue and Hay Street meet in Riverview.  The building itself has undergone many physical changes to meet the needs of the surrounding community.

Currently, Churchill High School maintains an enrolment of approximately 500 students.  The building also houses a second school, Collège Churchill, with an additional 150 students.  Athletics, Performing Arts and other co-curricular activities are shared between both schools.  This helps foster a positive and co-operative school spirit.  The school offers academic programs, including the Flexible Learning and Special Education Programs.  Churchill also provides many other experiences to connect students with the school and prepare them for an enjoyable and successful high school career.

School Cheer
A school cheer was chosen after a contest was held in 1962. 
Churchill High, Churchill Ho Yea, Yea Churchill go
Head for the red
Fight for the white
You for the blue
And victory too.
Churchill High, Churchill Ho Yea, Yea, Churchill go!

Recent history
In 2014, two former bulldogs Evan Gill and Thomas Miles were drafted into the CFL in rounds 1 and 4.

In 2013, Tanis Westdal, a teacher in Churchill's Flexible Learning program, was a recipient of the Prime Minister's Awards for Teaching Excellence.

The Churchill Bulldogs football team won the WHSFL's Anavets Bowl in 2008. The Churchill Bulldogs hockey team won the WHSHL championship in 2010. In 2009, Churchill High School was named a UNESCO school.

References
http://www.winnipegfreepress.com/our-communities/souwester/Churchill-High-teacher-honoured-234473171.html

External links
 Churchill High School

High schools in Winnipeg
Educational institutions established in 1955
1955 establishments in Manitoba
River Heights, Winnipeg